Clanfield is a village and civil parish in the south-east of the East Hampshire district of Hampshire, England. It sits to the west of the main A3 road, just north of where the A3(M) (Motorway) ends.

The surrounding villages are Horndean, Catherington, Hinton Daubney, Chalton, East Meon, and Hambledon It has a semi-rural character with 3 sides of the village being adjoined by fields including Queen Elizabeth Country Park. Clanfield is overlooked from the other side of the A3 road by Windmill Hill and Chalton Windmill which stands at 193 metres above sea level. Many references in Clanfield feature the windmill, such as Windmill Garage.

The population of Clanfield is c. 4,854 (estimated 2011), however property development and new homes since the 2011 census means that this is expected to have increased and was estimated to be over 6000 in 2017 Clanfield is a popular area for walkers, with Queen Elizabeth Country Park being next to the village. The old village also has a restored pond, a thatched village well, the Clanfield memorial hall, and the church of St. James.

Clanfield consists of two parts, "Old" Clanfield and "New" Clanfield. Old Clanfield has been around for roughly 250 years and New Clanfield about 60 years.

There are two schools. Petersgate Infant in New Clanfield and Clanfield Junior School in Old Clanfield.

Clanfield is twinned with Val d'Oison, France

History
The name Clanfield is derived from the Old English and means "cleared field". Clanfield was historically a small farming community centred about the church of St James, that dates from 1305 and was rebuilt in 1875 and contains two ancient medieval bells. The community in 1929 recorded the population as 129, by the late 1940s almost 500, and in 1998 over 4500, with almost 1700 households.

The South Downs National Park borders Clanfield on three sides (east, north and west) and includes a large part of the undeveloped part of the village to the north (the former Area of Outstanding Natural Beauty).

Politics
Clanfield has a parish council, two councillors for the Clanfield and Finchdean ward of East Hampshire District Council, and one councillor for the Petersfield Butser electoral division of Hampshire County Council.

Clanfield is in the newly (2007) created Meon Valley constituency for elections to the House of Commons. Prior to Brexit in 2020, it was in the South East England constituency for elections to the European Parliament. Voting takes place in the Memorial Hall or Sports Centre. Since 2010 the Conservatives have won every election in the Meon Valley constituency.

Public transport
There are bus services to Southsea, Portsmouth and Petersfield.

There are railway stations at Petersfield and Rowlands Castle

Community and sport
There are three parks in Clanfield. All have swings and other child play items and Peel Park has a skateboard park. There is a park near the Sports centre in the new housing estate. South Lane Meadow has a cricket ground, and Peel Park has football pitches. Peel park has a building with changing rooms in. Clanfield has a football club called Clanfield F.C. The club contains teams for children, which are split into year groups.

Clanfield's major community centres are Clanfield Memorial Hall, in South Lane, Clanfield Sports and Community Centre, Endal way, the St James Church Hall and Leader Hall (for the Scouts), both Little Hyden Lane. The sports centre opened in 2019.

There are three public houses and one wine bar. The rebuilt Rising Sun in the old village, the Hampshire Hog (previously Hogs Lodge) on the outskirts of the parish near the A3 and the famous Bat and Ball Inn, in Hyden Farm Lane, opposite the "Cradle of Cricket", Broadhalfpenny Down cricket ground. The boundary between Clanfield and Hambledon used to run through the Bat & Ball and the brass strip marking the old boundary still runs across the floor. Both the original Hogs Lodge (which was originally further behind the present one) and the Bat And Ball were occupied by members of the Murrant family.  Originally a nineteenth-century building, in 1969 the Rising Sun achieved fame as the pub that was built in one day.

There is a not-for-profit website funded by local business intended to benefit the community.

Also in Clanfield is the Clanfield Observatory run by the Hampshire Astronomical Group, who have open days. The observatory is next to one of Portsmouth Water's reservoirs.

References

External links

Hampshire County Council
East Hampshire District Council
British History Online
Hampshire County Council Web pages

Villages in Hampshire
Civil parishes in Hampshire